Donald Johnson and Francisco Montana were the defending champions, but Johnson chose to compete at Basel in the same week. Montana teamed up with Nebojša Đorđević and lost in the first round to Pablo Albano and Guillermo Cañas.

Mariano Hood and Sebastián Prieto won the title by defeating Lan Bale and Alberto Martín 6–3, 6–1 in the final.

Seeds

Draw

Draw

References

External links
 Official results archive (ATP)
 Official results archive (ITF)

Campionati Internazionali di Sicilia
1999 ATP Tour
Camp